Arachnia may refer to:
 , a 2003 USA horror film
 Arachnia (bacterium), a genus of bacteria in the family Propionibacteriaceae
 Arachnia, a genus of butterflies in the family Nymphalidae, synonym of Araschnia